Angelus-Rosedale Cemetery is a cemetery at 1831 West Washington Boulevard in the Harvard Heights neighborhood, southwest of Downtown.

The interments include pioneers and members of leading families in Los Angeles and the state.

Rosedale was the first cemetery in Los Angeles open to all races and creeds, and was the first to adopt the design concept of lawn cemeteries. This is where the grounds are enhanced to surround the graves with beautiful trees, shrubs, flowers, natural scenery and works of monumental art. Among the more traditional structures, headstones and mausoleums, the cemetery also has several pyramid crypts.
In 1887, the second crematory in the US was opened at Rosedale Cemetery. It was also the first crematory west of the Rocky Mountains. The initial cremation took place on June 16, when the body of Mrs. Olive A. Bird (c. 1845–1886), wife of prominent physician O.B. Bird, was cremated. By 1913, there had been 2,392 cremations performed at Rosedale. Next to the cemetery at 1605 S. Catalina Street is another cremation facility, the domed, observatory-shaped Chapel of the Pines Crematory.

In 1993, Rosedale was bought by the Angelus Funeral Home on Crenshaw Boulevard and renamed Angelus-Rosedale Cemetery.



Notable interments
Sources not listed here can be found in the articles referenced.

A
 George Alexander (1839–1923), politician, 28th Mayor of Los Angeles
 Allen Allensworth (1842–1914), Lt. Colonel of the U.S. Army, founder of Allensworth, California
 Ivie Anderson (1905–1949), jazz singer and actress
 Henry Armstrong (1912–1988), champion boxer

B
 Edward L. Baker, Jr. (1865–1913), U.S. Army officer, Medal of Honor recipient during Spanish–American War
 Phineas Banning (1830–1885), financier, known as the "Father of the Port of Los Angeles"
 Felice Bauer (1887–1960), twice fiancée (1914 and 1917) of Prague writer Franz Kafka, in 1919 married to Moritz Marasse (1873–1950)
 Thomas Bones (1842–1929), farmer and land developer
 Emmer Bowen (1830–1912), Medal of Honor recipient during the American Civil War
 Tod Browning (1880–1962), film director and screenwriter, known as "The Master of the Macabre"
 David Burbank (1821–1895), dentist, businessman and landholder. Burbank, California, was named for him
 Rose Talbot Bullard (1864–1915), medical doctor and professor
 Betty Burbridge (1895–1987), actress

C
 Eric Campbell (1879–1917), actor
 Rita Carewe (1909–1955), actress
 Harry Carr (1877–1936), writer, newspaper columnist and editor
 Frank Chance (1877–1924), Hall of Fame baseball player
 Sadie Chandler Cole (1865–1941), singer, civil rights activist
 Florence Cole Talbert (1890–1961), opera singer
 Cleota Collins (1893–1976), singer and voice teacher

D
 Eric Dolphy (1928–1964), American jazz musician

E
 Herschel Evans (1909–1939), Afroamerican jazz saxophonist

F
 Jessie Benton Frémont (1824–1902), writer, wife of Lieutenant Colonel John C. Frémont
 Willie Fung (1896–1945), Chinese film actor

G
 John Reynolds Gardiner (1944–2006), author
 William Thornton Glassell (1831–1879), Confederate Naval officer and a founder of Orange, California; grand-uncle of George S. Patton
 Louise Glaum (1888–1970), actress
 George E. Goodfellow (1855–1910), physician, medical pioneer, known as the "Gunfighter's Surgeon"
 Lewis Grigsby (1867–1932), real estate investor and philanthropist

H
 Arthur C. Harper (1866–1948), politician, 36th Mayor of Los Angeles
 Theresa Harris (1909–1985), actress
 Katharine Putnam Hooker (1849–1935), travel writer, socialite
 Sherman Otis Houghton (1828–1914), lawyer, politician

K
 Harry Kellar (1849–1922), American magician who influenced Harry Houdini

L
 Fernando Lamas (1915–1982), Argentinian-born actor/director, husband of Esther Williams, was cremated at Rosedale

M
 Joseph Maier (1851–1905), brewer, businessman and owner the Maier-Zobelien Brewery in Los Angeles
 John Mansfield (1822–1896), politician, lieutenant governor of California from 1880 to 1883
 Joe Marshall (1876–1931), Major League Baseball player
 William B. Mayes (1837–1900), Union Army soldier, Medal of Honor recipient
 Owen McAleer (1858–1944), politician, Canadian-born 35th mayor of Los Angeles
 Hattie McDaniel (1895–1952), actress, first African American female to win an Academy Award
 Spencer G. Millard (1856–1895), politician, 20th lieutenant governor of California
 Mable Monohan (1888–1953), murder victim; her death sent Barbara Graham, Emmet Perkins and Jack Santo to the gas chamber
 Gideon C. Moody (1832–1904), American politician, congressman and senator
 Tim Moore (1887–1958), vaudevillian; comic actor, stage, screen and television. Known for his role as The Kingfish of Amos 'n' Andy fame.

N
 Remi Nadeau (1819–1887), French Canadian pioneer who arrived in Los Angeles in 1861
 Marshall Neilan (1891–1958), director, actor, motion picture pioneer
 John G. Nichols (1813–1898), 3rd and 10th Mayor of Los Angeles

O
 Henry Z. Osborne (1848–1923), politician, served in the House of Representatives from California

P
 John Henry Patterson (1867–1947), Anglo-Irish soldier, hunter, author and Zionist, best known for his book The Man-Eaters of Tsavo (1907); exhumed and re-interred in Avihayil, Israel, in 2014.
 William Anthony Polkinghorn (1851–1906), noted real estate developer (Venice, Santa Monica), civic leader (Los Angeles, Leadville, CO)
 Louise Peete (1880–1947), notorious multiple murderer, executed in the gas chamber at San Quentin
 Stanley Price (1892–1955), actor

R
 Frank Rader (1848–1897), politician, 31st Mayor of Los Angeles
 Andy Razaf (1895–1973), lyricist, composer, wrote "Ain't Misbehavin'" and "Honeysuckle Rose"
 Frederick H. Rindge (1857–1905), American businessman, philanthropist and writer
 Anthony A. C. Rogers (1821–1899), politician, served in the House of Representatives from Arkansas
 Maria Rasputin (1898–1977), daughter of Russia's notorious "mad monk", Grigori Rasputin

S
 Monroe Salisbury (1876–1935), actor
 Caroline Severance (1820–1914), social reformer, suffragette
 Herman Silver (1831–1913), superintendent of the United States Mint in Colorado, a collector of internal revenue, a railroad official and Los Angeles City Council member
 Everett Sloane (1909–1965), actor, was in Orson Welles' Mercury Theatre, played Mr. Bernstein in Citizen Kane
 Robert Stewart Sparks (1871–1932), Los Angeles City Council member
 Hannah Judkins Starbird (1832–1922), American Civil War nurse
 William Stephens (1859–1944), 24th California Governor

T
 Art Tatum (1909–1956), jazz pianist (has cenotaph; originally interred here, he was removed to Forest Lawn Cemetery, Glendale)
 William I. Traeger (1880–1935), lawman, politician, football coach, sheriff of Los Angeles County from 1921 to 1932, served term in the House of Representatives from California
 Wayland Trask, Jr. (1887–1918), American stage and silent film comedian
 John Q. Tufts (1840–1908), politician, served in the House of Representatives from Iowa

W
 Ernestine Wade (1906–1983), actress, played Sapphire Stevens on radio and TV's Amos 'n' Andy
 Olin Wellborn (1843–1921), politician, served in House of Representatives from Texas
 Franz Werfel (1890–1945), Austrian writer (whose body was transferred in 1975 to the Zentralfriedhof, Vienna)
 Ernest Whitman (1893–1954), actor, played the Carpetbagger's friend in Gone with the Wind
 Robert M. Widney (1838–1929), American lawyer, judge, a founder of the University of Southern California
 Harvey H. Wilcox (1832–1891), owned a ranch northwest of Los Angeles, which his wife, Daeida, named Hollywood. Originally interred in Rosedale, alongside his mother, Azubah (Mark) Wilcox (c. 1804–1888); he was removed to Hollywood Cemetery in 1922
 Dooley Wilson (1886–1953), actor, musician, played Sam in Casablanca
 Valentin Wolfenstein (1845–1909), Swedish-American photographer
 Anna May Wong (1905–1961), actress, the first Chinese American movie star
 Frederick T. Woodman (1872–1949), politician, 41st mayor of Los Angeles

References

External links

 

 Political Graveyard – a listing of politicians by burial place

Cemeteries in Los Angeles
Pico-Union, Los Angeles
History of Los Angeles
1884 establishments in California
19th century in Los Angeles